Srikanta is a 2017 Indian Kannada-language romantic action drama film written and directed by Manju Swaraj. The film, which was released on 6 January 2017, was produced by M. S. Manu Gowda under the banner Mahashaila Cinebandha. Based on the 2-page short story Skhalana by Nagathihalli Chandrashekar which was published in 1985 in the weekly Kannada magazine Taranga, the film features Shiva Rajkumar and Chandini Sreedharan in the lead roles along with Vijay Raghavendra in a key supporting role. The principal photography of the film began on 16 October 2015.

The film was released on 6 January 2017. and was a hit at the box office completing 25 days run at the box office.

Plot

An ambulance is trying to get through traffic, but the roads are completely jammed due to a riot in Karnataka. Srikantha offers a ride to Tarun, a reporter who wants to go to Agumbe as many buses are halted due to an ongoing strike. Tarun asks about Srikanta's background and lifestyle. Srikanta tells that he and his friends do odd jobs, but only if they will get money from them, and is also very stubborn in his ways. In order to defeat the MLA Devaraj out of spite, Devaraj's PA Prabhu plans on running an equally popular humble social worker Satyamurthy, who also serves the public directly. Prabhu asks for Srikanta's help to spread publicity about the candidate; Srikanta obliges after payment, and moves promotions to full swing.

Shashi asks Srikanta for some help, as some goons acted inappropriately with her friend and took illicit pictures. Srikanta destroys the photos and later finds out that Shashi run an ashram for physically challenged children and is collecting donations. Srikanta rounds many locals and asks them to volunteer for organ donation after they pass to help the children of the ashram. This pleases Shashi and makes her develops feelings for Srikanta, but Srikanta tells her that his lifestyle is not for her and it is her mistake to love him. Despite this, Srikanta and Shashi marry, but Srikanta does not change as Shashi had hoped, even after she becomes pregnant and Srikanta's friends reform.

Meanwhile, Satyamurthy is growing more and more popular against Devaraj. To bolster even more support, Srikanta is asked to bring more people to stage a publicity stunt. Almost all of Srikanta's friends opt out, but one of his friends opts in; as part of the stunt, gasoline is poured, but with no intention to actually light a fire. Despite this, someone lights a fire and quickly escapes, shocking Srikanta as his friend is now dead. After seeing Prabhu escaping from the crowd, Srikanta tries to kill Prabhu, but Prabhu reveals that Satyamurthy had been acting as a ruse of a humble man, and was actually vying for a political seat for the whole time and that Satyamurthy's henchmen caused the burnings. 

Srikanta tries to expose Satyamurthy, but realizes that Satyamurthy is almost untouchable at this point. Additionally, Shashi leaves Srikanta, but Srikanta barely convinces her to rejoin him, and they bond with each other and their imminent child. Satyamurthy targets the ashram as it is a prime real estate, and kicks out the ashram's head Subbanna and the residents. Srikanta and Prabhu plan a sting operation on the top political candidates, including Devaraj and Satyamurthy, causing the government to implode. As they prepare to deliver the evidence, Srikanta gets a call from Satyamurthy, who has kidnapped Shashi. 

Srikanta saves Shashi, and a fight ensues while the evidence is being aired on all the news channels. Shashi and Srikanta barely escape from Satyamurthy, and the public joins together and thrashes Satyamurthy to death. Back to the car ride, Srikanta and the press reporter arrive at Shashi's village, where many people are waiting. Srikanta opens the trunk, and they collect Shashi's dead corpse so that Shashi's parents can mourn, shocking Tarun. Srikanta and Tarun leave and continue their journey to Agumbe, where Srikanta reveals that Satyamurthy had actually landed a swing on Shashi's womb; Despite Srikanta rushing Shashi via ambulance, The ambulance was struck by the riots that Srikanta himself had caused and Shashi died in the ambulance. Despite the pain and sorrow that Srikanta feels due to his undoing, he finds solace in knowing that Shashi is always with him.

Cast
 Shiva Rajkumar as Srikanta
 Chandini Sreedharan as Shashi
 Vijay Raghavendra as Tarun, press reporter
 H. G. Dattatreya as Subbanna 
 Achyuth Kumar as Prabhu, Devaraj's PA
 Bullet Prakash as Brahmananda Swamiji
 Deepak Shetty as Satyamurthy
 Chi. Guru Dutt as MLA Devaraj
 Anil Kumar as Satyamurthy's henchman 
 Manjunath Gowda
 Sparsha Rekha in an extended cameo as Srikanta's friend

Soundtrack

The background score and soundtrack of the film was composed by B. Ajaneesh Loknath. The soundtrack album consists of five tracks. It has lyrics penned by Prof. Krishne Gowda, Pradyumna Narahalli, Chethan Kumar and V. Nagendra Prasad. The album was released on 17 December 2017.

Critical reception 

Sunayana Suresh of The Times of India  scored the film at 3 out of 5 stars and says Shivarajkumar is in top form and delivers a good performance. Newbie Chandni does a good job. Vijay Raghavendra has a small but pivotal role to play. The film doesn't go jingoistic and play to the gallery like Shankar's films that touch upon such topics of social reforms, but is rather subdued in its style". Shyam Prasad S, reviewing for Bangalore Mirror  gave the film a 3.5 out of 5 stars and wrote Shiva Rajkumar gives an assured and mature performance. Chandini makes an impressive debut in Kannada. Ajaneesh Loknath churns out some engrossing tunes and the cinematography by Sureshbabu gives the film a realistic touch. But it is Deepu S Kumar who is the star on the other side of the screen, apart from the director".
S Vishwanath , reviewing for Deccan Herald , Srikanta wages a valiant battle to overcome odds, including saving an orphanage from being usurped, forms the rest of the film with a surprise climax".

References

External links

2017 films
2010s Kannada-language films
2017 action thriller films
Indian action thriller films
2017 crime action films
Indian crime action films
2010s road movies
Indian road movies
Films directed by Manju Swaraj